Afrocneros is a genus of tephritid  or fruit flies in the family Tephritidae.

Species
Species include:
 Afrocneros excellens
 Afrocneros mundissimus
 Afrocneros mundus

References

Phytalmiinae
Tephritidae genera